Exploits is a provincial electoral district for the House of Assembly of Newfoundland and Labrador, Canada.

In central Newfoundland on the Bay of Exploits, it lies between the Trans-Canada Highway in the south and Notre Dame Bay in the north. Most of the population lives in the southern centres of Botwood and Bishop's Falls.

To the north, Exploits includes communities in Notre Dame Bay such as Cottrell's Cove, but most of the population lives in southern centres such as Botwood and Bishop's Falls. Communities include: Bishop's Falls, Bishop's Falls South, Botwood, Charles Brook, Cottrell's Cove, Fortune Harbour, Glovers Harbour, Leading Tickles West, Moore's Cove, Northern Arm, Peterview, Phillip's Head, Pleasantview, Point Leamington, Point of Bay, Ritter's Arm and Wooddale.

The district was formerly represented by Liberal Premier Roger Grimes.

Members of the House of Assembly
The district has elected the following Members of the House of Assembly:

Election results 

|}

|}

|-

|-

|}

 
|PC
|Clayton Forsey
|align="right"|2,605
|align="right"|55.2
|align="right"|
|-

|-
 
| style="width: 130px" |NDP
|John Whelan
|align="right"|159
|align="right"|3.4
|align="right"|
|- bgcolor="white"
!align="left" colspan=3|Total
!align="right"|4,722
!align="right"|100%
!align="right"|
|}

|-

|-

|-
 
|NDP
|John Whelan
|align="right"|168 
|align="right"|2.93%  
|align="right"|
|}

|-

|-

|-
 
|NDP
|Arnold Best
|align="right"|633 
|align="right"| 
|align="right"|
|}

References

External links 
Website of the Newfoundland and Labrador House of Assembly

Newfoundland and Labrador provincial electoral districts